The Waiohine River is a river of the Greater Wellington Region of New Zealand's North Island.

At first it flows generally south from its origins in the Tararua Range west of Otaki. It turns south-east once it reaches the plain where it passes to the north of Greytown and flows into the Ruamahanga River at Pāpāwai. Its main tributary is the Mangatarere Stream.

Some of its water reaches Lake Wairarapa directly through many channels and irrigation features in Greytown's fruit-growing district.

See also
List of rivers of New Zealand

References

 

Rivers of the Wellington Region
Rivers of New Zealand